NGC 713 is a spiral galaxy located in the constellation of Cetus about 234 million light years from the Milky Way. It was discovered by the American astronomer Francis Leavenworth in 1886.

See also 
 List of NGC objects (1–1000)

References

External links 
 

Spiral galaxies
Cetus (constellation)
0713
007161